Gems with Friends is a free, tile-matching video game for iOS by Zynga. It's the sixth entry in Zynga's 'With Friends' series of games with a global release.

Gameplay
Gems with Friends is a turn-based game with timed rounds. Players also receive one free Power Gem for each game, which they can use as a wild card to combine with any two similar gems. During the game, players have three two-minute rounds, during which they drag and drop numbered gems as fast as possible. The goal is to match three gems to score points. Gems with Friends players can chat with other players, as they do in other 'With Friends' games.

Release
Gems with Friends was released globally for iOS on September 6, 2012.

Gems with Friends is no longer available as a free iOS app or a $2 paid app.

References

External links
Gems with Friends announcement on Zynga Blog

2012 video games
Video games developed in the United States
Android (operating system) games
IOS games
Zynga
Tile-matching video games